Elina Samantray is an Indian actress who works in Odia films. She made her career debut with the film Ishq Tu Hi Tu. She was the winner of the first season of the reality television show Kie Heba Mo Heroine, which was broadcast on Tarang TV. She also works in Bengal film industry.

Career

Samantray came to Ollywood industry after winning the reality television show Kie Heba Mo Heroine, which was broadcast on Tarang TV. The first film of her career was Ishq Tu Hi Tu, which is based on the 1991 communal riots of Dhamnagar area of district Bhadrak. Her next two releases were Kehi Nuhe Kahara and Jaga Hatare Pagha. In 2016 she appeared in Love Station alongside Babushan. Later in the same year, she appeared in Jhia Ta Bigidi Gala.

In 2017, she worked with Ollywood actor Anubhav Mohanty in Abhaya and Kabula Barabula.  Her next film Happy Lucky with Jyoti Ranjan Nayak, Sambeet Acharya and Sasmita (winner of Kie Heba Mo Heroine Season 3) was released on 14 January 2018.

She appeared in lead role in the film 4 Idiots, along with Sabyasachi Mishra. She is also seen in lead role in the Odia comedy film Tokata Fasigala alongside Sabyasachi Mishra and Papu Pom Pom.

Filmography

Awards

References

External links

 

Living people
Actresses from Odisha
Actresses in Odia cinema
Ollywood
1996 births
21st-century Indian actresses